Bellefonte is a town in New Castle County, Delaware, United States.  According to the 2010 Census, the population of the town is 1,193.

Geography
Bellefonte is located at  (39.7662246, –75.5093647).  The town is roughly centered at the intersection of Brandywine Boulevard and Bellefonte Avenue.

Climate
The climate in this area is characterized by hot, humid summers and generally mild to cool winters.  According to the Köppen Climate Classification system, Bellefonte has a humid subtropical climate, abbreviated "Cfa" on climate maps.

Infrastructure

Transportation

Brandywine Boulevard serves as the main street through Bellefonte, passing southwest-northeast through the town. U.S. Route 13 Business (Philadelphia Pike) passes along the northwestern edge of Bellefonte, heading northeast to Claymont and southwest to Wilmington. Delaware Route 3 passes to the west of Bellefonte and provides access to Interstate 95 to the north and Interstate 495 to the south in Edgemoor. The nearest train station to Bellefonte is the Wilmington station, which is served by Amtrak and SEPTA Regional Rail's Wilmington/Newark Line. DART First State provides bus service to Bellefonte along Route 31, which passes through the town along Brandywine Boulevard along its route between the Wilmington station and the Claymont station serving SEPTA Regional Rail's Wilmington/Newark Line; Route 13, which follows Philadelphia Pike along the northwestern edge of town on its route between the Walmart on Wilton Boulevard in New Castle and Northtowne Plaza in Claymont via Wilmington; and Route 4, which begins at the Village at Fox Point Apartments just southeast of Bellefonte and heads west to Wilmington and Prices Corner.

Utilities
Delmarva Power, a subsidiary of Exelon, provides electricity and natural gas to Bellefonte. Suez Delaware, a subsidiary of Suez North America, provides water to Bellefonte. Sewer service in Bellefonte is provided by New Castle County. Trash and recycling collection in Bellefonte is provided under contract by GFL Environmental.

Education
Bellefonte is in the Brandywine School District.

Demographics

At the 2000 census there were 1,249 people, 537 households, and 325 families living in the town. The racial makeup of the town was 95.92% White, 2.40% African American, 0.64% Asian, 0.56% from other races, and 0.48% from two or more races. Hispanic or Latino of any race were 1.20%.

Of the 537 households 28.5% had children under the age of 18 living with them, 45.4% were married couples living together, 10.1% had a female householder with no husband present, and 39.3% were non-families. 32.2% of households were one person and 12.1% were one person aged 65 or older.  The average household size was 2.33 and the average family size was 3.00.

The age distribution was 23.5% under the age of 18, 5.0% from 18 to 24, 35.0% from 25 to 44, 21.1% from 45 to 64, and 15.5% 65 or older.  The median age was 38 years. For every 100 females, there were 93.6 males.  For every 100 females age 18 and over, there were 90.1 males.

The median household income was $49,231 and the median family income  was $59,375. Males had a median income of $37,723 versus $30,078 for females. The per capita income for the town was $22,661.  About 2.1% of families and 4.0% of the population were below the poverty line, including 5.9% of those under age 18 and 6.7% of those age 65 or over.

Government

Bellefonte is governed by a five-member Town Commission. As of 2023, the Town Commission consists of President Scott MacKenzie (term expires June 2023), Secretary Andrew Ritchie (term expires June 2024), Elisa King (term expires June 2023), Brandon Dougherty (term expires June 2024), and Ross Logan (term expires June 2024).

See also

 List of municipalities in Delaware

References

External links

 

Towns in New Castle County, Delaware
Towns in Delaware